Azerbaijan competed at the 2000 Summer Paralympics in Sydney, Australia having won one silver medal. Powerlifter Gunduz Ismayilov who initially had won a gold medal in Men's -90kg competition lifting 240 kg to set a world record was stripped of it with his record nullified after testing positive for the anabolic steroid nandrolone. Ismayilov subsequently was banned from the Paralympics for life in 2004 after testing positive for stanazolol in the 2004 Summer Paralympics.

Medalists

See also
Azerbaijan at the Paralympics
Azerbaijan at the 2000 Summer Olympics

References

External links
Sydney 2000 Press Release, International Paralympic Committee

Nations at the 2000 Summer Paralympics
2000
2000 in Azerbaijani sport